The official language of Libya is Modern Standard Arabic. Most residents speak one of the varieties of Arabic as a first language, most prominently Libyan Arabic, but also Egyptian Arabic and Tunisian Arabic.

Major language

Arabic
The official language of Libya is Arabic. The local Libyan Arabic variety is the common spoken vernacular.

Minority languages
Berber

Various Berber languages are also spoken, including Tamasheq, Ghadamès, Nafusi, Suknah and Awjilah. Both Berber and Arabic languages belong to the wider Afroasiatic (Hamito-Semitic) family.

The most significant berber speaking group, the Nafusi, is concentrated in the Tripolitanian region. Berber languages are also spoken in some oases, including Ghadamès, Awjilah, Sawknah. Tamahaq is spoken by the Tuareg.

Libya's former Head of State Muammar Gaddafi denied the existence of Berbers as a separate ethnicity, and called Berbers a "product of colonialism" created by the West to divide Libya. The Berber language was not recognized or taught in schools, and for years it was forbidden in Libya to give children Berber names.

After recent uprisings in Libya, the National Transitional Council (Revolutionaries) has shown an openness towards the Berber language. The independent Revolutionaries "Libya TV", has included the Berber language and its Tifinagh alphabet in some of its programming.

Domari

The Domari, an Indo-Iranian language spoken by the Dom people (ca. 33,000 speakers).

Tedega

Tedaga, a Saharan language is spoken by the previously nomadic Teda people. The exact number of Teda is unknown.

Turkish 

A minority of Turkish speakers can be found in Libya, most of them belonging to the Kouloughli ethnicity that inhabit cities like Tripoli, Benghazi, and Misrata.

Greek

The Greek language is spoken by an unknown number of speakers in Cyrenaica by some of the descendants of Greek Muslims (locally called Gritlis) who settled in the region at the end of the 19th century.

Foreign languages
English is a notable foreign language in business and for economical purposes and also spoken by the young generation.

Italian is spoken in the Italian Libyan community. Number of Italians and Italian speakers has drastically diminished since Libya's declaration of independence and mass repatriation of Italians. Nevertheless, English, French and Italian are used in commerce, due to the large influx of foreigners. 

After the Libyan Civil War and the help coming from France, the French language gained popularity among the younger generations. French authorities expressed their interest to encourage the teaching of French in Libya.

References

External links 

 http://www.endangeredlanguages.com/lang/country/Libya – Endangered Languages Project